Axel Desjardins (born January 13, 2000) is a Canadian professional soccer player who plays as a goalkeeper for Italian Serie C club Novara.

Early career
At 11, he started playing with the Braves d'Ahuntsic. When he was 13, his goaltending coach let him know about an academy in Italy run by Montrealer Jos Recine (Contact Sports Management) that gave opportunities to players from Australia, the United States and Canada. He went to Genoa, to participate in an exhibition match with the academies of Juventus, Genoa, Inter Milan and Spezia, and attracted the attention of the Spezia coaches, who invited him to trial with the team, after which he was offered a spot in their academy.

Club career
Desjardins is a youth academy graduate of Spezia. He made his professional debut for the club on July 31, 2020 in a Serie B match against Salernitana. He replaced Titas Krapikas in the stoppage minute of second half as his team won the match 2–1.

On October 6, 2020, Serie C club Novara signed Desjardins on a season long loan deal.

On November 25, 2021, he would re-join Novara on a permanent deal, after they had been relegated to Serie D.

International career
In October 2018, Canada under-20 team head coach Andrew Olivieri called up Desjardins to attend a training camp ahead of 2018 CONCACAF U-20 Championship.

References

External links
 

2000 births
Living people
Soccer players from Montreal
Association football goalkeepers
Canadian soccer players
Spezia Calcio players
Novara F.C. players
Serie B players
Serie C players
Canadian expatriate soccer players
Expatriate footballers in Italy
Canadian expatriate sportspeople in Italy